The football (soccer) Campeonato Brasileiro Série B 1999, the second level of Brazilian National League, was played from August 1 to December 12, 1999. The competition had 22 clubs and two of them were promoted to Série A and six were relegated to Série C. The competition was won by Goiás.

Goiás finished the final phase group with the most points, and was declared 1999 Brazilian Série B champions, claiming the promotion to the 2000 Série A along with Santa Cruz, the runners-up. The six worst ranked teams in the first round (União São João, Criciúma, Paysandu, América-RN, Tuna Luso and Desportiva) would be relegated to play Série C in 2000. However, with the debacle that resulted in the creation of the Copa João Havelange in 2000, Bahia (third-placed) and América-MG (sixth-placed) were promoted to Série A, and from the originally-relegated teams, only Tuna Luso actually played the Green and White Group, the equivalent to the Série C, with the other five relegated teams playing the Group Yellow. For 2001, all of the participating teams in 1999's Série B, with the exception of Goiás, São Caetano, América-MG, Bahia and Santa Cruz were included in that year's Série B.

Teams

First stage

Quarterfinals

Final stage

Final standings

Sources

Campeonato Brasileiro Série B seasons
1999 in Brazilian football leagues